Neurosis (plural: neuroses) is a term mainly used today by followers of Freudian thinking to describe mental disorders caused by past anxiety, often that has been repressed. This concept is more usually known today as psychological trauma.

In recent history, the term has also referred to anxiety-related conditions more generally.

Sublimation can be considered neuroses' positive counterpart.

Neurosis should not be mistaken for psychosis, which refers to a loss of touch with reality. Nor should it be mistaken for its descendant term neuroticism, which refers to a personality trait of being prone to anxiousness and mental collapse.

History
The term is derived from the Greek word neuron (νεῦρον, 'nerve') and the suffix -osis (-ωσις, 'diseased' or 'abnormal condition').

The term neurosis was coined by Scottish doctor William Cullen in 1769 to refer to "disorders of sense and motion" caused by a "general affection of the nervous system." Cullen used the term to describe various nervous disorders and symptoms that could not be explained physiologically. Physical features, however, were almost inevitably present, and physical diagnostic tests, such as exaggerated knee-jerks, loss of the gag reflex and dermatographia, were used into the 20th century.

French psychiatrist Pierre Janet believed that the main aspect of psychological trauma is dissociation (a disconnection of the conscious mind from reality) in 1889. (Freud would later claim Janet as a major influence.)

In the 1890s, after working with Janet, French neurologist Jean-Martin Charcot argued that psychological trauma was the origin of all instances of the mental illness known as hysteria.

Austrian psychiatrist Sigmund Freud was a student of Charcot in 1885-6. Freud was also mentored by Austrian psychiatrist Josef Breuer. Breuer and Freud wrote Studies on Hysteria (1895) together, which established the field of psychoanalysis. The book included five case studies, the most famous becoming that of Breuer's patient "Anna O."

Freud developed a number of different theories of neurosis. The most impactful one was that it referred to mental disorders caused by the brain's defence against past psychological trauma. This redefined the general understanding and use of the word. It came to replace the concept of "hysteria."

Freud's most important work on the topic was his lectures later grouped together as "General Theory of the Neuroses" (1916–17), forming part 3 of the book Introduction to Psychoanalysis (1923).

In that work, Freud noted that:The meaning of neurotic symptoms was first discovered by J. Breuer in the study and felicitous cure of a case of hysteria which has since become famous (1880–82). It is true that P. Janet independently reached the same result; [and published it a decade earlier]...

The [neurotic] symptom develops as a substitution for something else that has remained suppressed. Certain psychological experiences should normally have become so far elaborated that consciousness would have attained knowledge of them. This did not take place, however, but out of these interrupted and disturbed processes, imprisoned in the unconscious, the symptom arose...

Our therapy does its work by means of changing the unconscious into the conscious, and is effective only in so far as it has the opportunity of bringing about this transformation...Followers of Freud's psychoanalytic thinking, including the Austrian Alfred Adler, Swiss Carl Jung, German-American Karen Horney, and the French Jacques Lacan, continued to develop his neurosis ideas. The term continues to be used in this sense in psychology and philosophy.

The fight-or-flight response was first described by American physiologist Walter Bradford Cannon in 1915.

The general adaptation syndrome (GAS) theory of stress was developed by Austro-Hungarian physiologist Hans Selye in 1936.

For his 1947 book, Dimensions of Personality, German-British psychologist Hans Eysenck created the term "neuroticism" to refer to someone whose "constitution may leave them liable to break down [emotionally] with the slightest provocation." The book outlines a two-factor theory of personality, with neuroticism as one of those two factors. This book would be greatly influential on future personality theory.

Karen Horney's Neurosis and Human Growth (1950) expanded the understanding of neuroses.

Monoamine oxidase inhibitors (MAOIs) and tricyclic antidepressants (TCAs) were developed for the treatment of neurosis and other conditions from the early 1950s. Because of their undesirable adverse-effect profile and high potential for toxicity, their use was limited.

The use of modern exposure therapy for neuroses began in the 1950s in South Africa. South African-American Joseph Wolpe was one of the first psychiatrists to spark interest in treating psychiatric problems as behavioral issues.

In 1957, American psychologist Albert Ellis published the paper Rational psychotherapy and individual psychology, in which he defined what is now known as rational emotive behavior therapy. Ellis believed that people's erroneous beliefs about their adversities was a major cause of neurosis, and his therapy aimed to dissolve these neuroses by correcting people's understandings. Ellis' therapy was also the beginning of what is now called cognitive behavioral therapy. Ellis' work was expanded on by fellow American, psychiatrist Aaron Beck.

Neurotics Anonymous began in February 1964, as a twelve-step program to help the neurotic. It was founded in Washington, D.C. by American psychologist Grover Boydston, and has since spread through the Americas.

Also in 1964, Polish psychiatrist Kazimierz Dąbrowski released his book Positive Disintegration. The book argues that developing and resolving "psychoneurosis" is a necessary part of healthy personality development.

In 1966, psychologists began to observe large numbers of children of Holocaust survivors seeking mental help in clinics in Canada. The grandchildren of Holocaust survivors were overrepresented by 300% among the referrals to psychiatry clinics in comparison with their representation in the general population. Further study lead to the better understanding of transgenerational trauma.

After Freudian thinking became less important in psychology, the term "neurosis" came to be used as a near synonym for "anxiety". The second edition of the American Psychiatric Association's Diagnostic and Statistical Manual of Mental Disorders (DSM-II) in 1968 described neuroses thusly: Anxiety is the chief characteristic of the neuroses. It may be felt and expressed directly, or it may be controlled unconsciously and automatically by conversion [into physical symptoms], displacement [into mental symptoms] and various other psychological mechanisms. Generally, these mechanisms produce symptoms experienced as subjective distress from which the patient desires relief. The neuroses, as contrasted to the psychoses, manifest neither gross distortion or misinterpretation of external reality, nor gross personality disorganization...In January 1980, the South African-British psychologist Stanley Rachman published a well-cited working definition of "emotional processing", aiming to define the "certain psychological experiences" Freud had mentioned in his 1923 book (and had earlier referred to).

The DSM eliminated its neurosis category in 1980 with the release of the DSM-III, because of a decision by its editors to provide descriptions of behavior rather than descriptions of hidden psychological mechanisms. This change was controversial. The various anxiety-related conditions previously considered neuroses are now classified differently.

The Phobia Society of America was founded by psychotherapist Jerilyn Ross and others in 1980. It would later expand its scope to cover all anxiety disorders and depression, which was reflected in it becoming known as the Anxiety and Depression Association of America.

In 1981, Richard Lazarus and Susan Folkman suggested that stress can be thought of as resulting from an "imbalance between demands and resources" or as occurring when "pressure exceeds one's perceived ability to cope". They developed the transactional model of stress.

Acceptance and commitment therapy (ACT) was started by American psychologist Steven C. Hayes in around 1982. The core conception of ACT is that psychological suffering is usually caused by experiential avoidance, cognitive entanglement, and resulting psychological rigidity that leads to a failure to take needed behavioral steps in accord with core values.

Stress inoculation training was developed to reduce anxiety in doctors during times of intense stress by Donald Meichenbaum in 1985.

In 1986, "emotional processing theory" was first presented by psychologists Edna Foa (Israeli-American) and Michael J Kozak (American). This lead to their development of prolonged exposure therapy for PTSD. It is characterized by two main treatment procedures. "Imaginal exposure" is repeated purposeful retelling of the trauma memory. "In vivo exposure" is gradually confronting situations, places, and things that are reminders of the trauma or feel dangerous (despite being objectively safe).

The first selective serotonin reuptake inhibitor (SSRI) medication went on the market in Belgium in 1986, and in other places soon after. This class of drugs largely replaced MOAIs and TCAs, as they were much safer.

Cognitive processing therapy (CPT) was developed by American psychologist Patricia Resick from 1988. The primary focus of the treatment is to help the client understand and reconceptualize their traumatic event in a way that reduces its ongoing negative effects on their current life. Decreasing avoidance of the trauma is crucial to this, since it is necessary for the client to examine and evaluate their meta-emotions and beliefs generated by the trauma.

The conservation of resources (COR) theory of stress was proposed by American psychologist Stevan Hobfoll in 1989. It is a heavily cited theory that describes the motivation that drives humans to both maintain their current resources and to pursue new resources. 

Trauma-focused cognitive-behavioral therapy (TF-CBT) was developed by Anthony Mannarino, Judith Cohen, and Esther Deblinger in the mid-1990s to help children and adolescents with PTSD. There are 3 treatment phases: stabilization, trauma narration and processing, and integration and consolidation.

In 2000, A cognitive model of posttraumatic stress disorder was published by psychologists Anke Ehlers (German-British) and David M. Clark (British). They and others followed this with a publishing of a treatment method based on this model in 2005. The three components of this are to: modify negative appraisals of the trauma; reduce re-experiencing symptoms by discussing trauma memories and learning how to differentiate between types of trauma triggers; and reduce behaviors and thoughts that contribute to the maintenance of the "sense of current threat".

In 2014, the bestselling book The Body Keeps the Score: Brain, Mind, and Body in the Healing of Trauma was released by Dutch-American psychiatrist Bessel van der Kolk. It explained the author's experiences of psychological trauma, and its consequent effects on mental and physical health.

The British Psychological Society commissioned the creation of the "Power Threat Meaning Framework" by a committee over five years, with its first major release in January 2018. The framework aims to provide a complete understanding of psychological trauma, and the best way to treat it. Contrary to most psychological approaches, it includes a large focus on the patient's environment.

The term "neurosis" is no longer used in condition names or categories by the World Health Organization's International Classification of Diseases (ICD). According to the American Heritage Medical Dictionary, the term is "no longer used in psychiatric diagnosis."

The Freudian meaning is conveyed through the DSM-5's "Trauma and Stress-Related Disorders" and the ICD-11's "Disorders specifically associated with stress" categories of conditions. The former includes:

 Reactive attachment disorder
 Disinhibited social engagement disorder
 Posttraumatic stress disorder
 Acute stress disorder
 Adjustment disorders
 Other specified trauma- and stressor-related disorder
 Adjustment-like disorders with a late onset
 Ataque de nervios
 Dhat syndrome
 Khyâl cap
 Kufungisisa
 Maladi moun
 Nervios
 Shenjing shuairuo
 Susto
 Taijin kyofusho
 Persistent complex bereavement disorder
 Unspecified trauma- and stressor-related disorder

The term "neuroticism" is also not now used for DSM or ICD conditions, however, it is a common name for one of the Big Five personality traits. A similar concept is included in the ICD-11 as the condition "negative affectivity".

Prevention 

Stress inoculation training was developed to reduce anxiety in doctors during times of intense stress by Donald Meichenbaum in 1985. It is a combination of techniques including relaxation, negative thought suppression, and real-life exposure to feared situations used in PTSD treatment. The therapy is divided into four phases and is based on the principles of cognitive-behavioral therapy. The first phase identifies the individual's specific reaction to stressors and how they manifest into symptoms. The second phase helps teach techniques to regulate these symptoms using relaxation methods. The third phase deals with specific coping strategies and positive cognitions to work through the stressors. Finally, the fourth phase exposes the client to imagined and real-life situations related to the traumatic event. This training helps to shape the response to future triggers to diminish impairment in daily life.

Another form of cognitive behavioural therapy has been found to be effective in preventing PTSD in patients diagnosed with acute stress disorder (ASD) with clinically significant results at six-month follow-up appointments. A combination of relaxation, cognitive restructuring, imaginal exposure, and in-vivo exposure was superior to supportive counselling. 

Mindfulness-based stress reduction programmes also appear to be effective for stress management.

The pharmacological approach has made some progress in lessening the effects of ASD. To relax patients and allow for better sleep, Prazosin can be given to patients, which regulates their sympathetic response. Hydrocortisone has shown some success as an early preventative measure following a traumatic event, typically in the treatment of PTSD.

Etiology

Historic versions of the DSM and ICD 
The term "neurosis" is no longer used in a professional diagnostic sense, it having been eliminated from the DSM in 1980 with the publication of DSM III, and having the last remnants of being removed from the ICD with the enacting of the ICD-11 in 2022. (In the ICD-10 it was used in section F48.8 to describe certain minor conditions.)

According to the "anxiety" concept of the term, there were many different neuroses, including:

 obsessive–compulsive disorder
 obsessive–compulsive personality disorder
 impulse control disorder
 anxiety disorder
 histrionic personality disorder
dissociative disorder
 a great variety of phobias

According to C. George Boeree, professor emeritus at Shippensburg University, the symptoms of neurosis may involve:

Psychoanalytic (Freudian) theory

According to psychoanalytic theory, neuroses may be rooted in ego defense mechanisms, though the two concepts are not synonymous. Defense mechanisms are a normal way of developing and maintaining a consistent sense of self (i.e., an ego). However, only those thoughts and behaviors that produce difficulties in one's life should be called neuroses.

A neurotic person experiences emotional distress and unconscious conflict, which are manifested in various physical or mental illnesses; the definitive symptom being anxiety. Neurotic tendencies are common and may manifest themselves as acute or chronic anxiety, depression, an obsessive–compulsive disorder, a phobia, or a personality disorder.

Freud's typology of neuroses in "Introduction to Psychoanalysis" (1923) included:

 Psychoneuroses
 Transference neuroses
 Hysteria
 Anxiety hysteria
 Various phobias
 Conversion hysteria
 Compulsion neuroses
 Trauma neuroses
 Narcistic neuroses
 True neuroses
 Neurasthenia
 Anxiety neurosis
 Hypochondria
 Paraphrenia [schizophrenia spectrum]
 Dementia praecox
 Paranoia
 Megalomania
 Mania of persecution
 Erotomania
 Mania of jealousy

Jungian theory

Carl Jung found his approach particularly effective for patients who are well adjusted by social standards but are troubled by existential questions. Jung claims to have "frequently seen people become neurotic when they content themselves with inadequate or wrong answers to the questions of life". Accordingly, the majority of his patients "consisted not of believers but of those who had lost their faith". A contemporary person, according to Jung, …is blind to the fact that, with all his rationality and efficiency, he is possessed by 'powers' that are beyond his control. His gods and demons have not disappeared at all; they have merely got new names. They keep him on the run with restlessness, vague apprehensions, psychological complications, an insatiable need for pills, alcohol, tobacco, food — and, above all, a large array of neuroses.Jung found that the unconscious finds expression primarily through an individual's inferior psychological function, whether it is thinking, feeling, sensation, or intuition. The characteristic effects of a neurosis on the dominant and inferior functions are discussed in his Psychological Types. Jung also found collective neuroses in politics: "Our world is, so to speak, dissociated like a neurotic."

Horney's theory
In her final book, Neurosis and Human Growth, Karen Horney lays out a complete theory of the origin and dynamics of neurosis. In her theory, neurosis is a distorted way of looking at the world and at oneself, which is determined by compulsive needs rather than by a genuine interest in the world as it is. Horney proposes that neurosis is transmitted to a child from their early environment and that there are many ways in which this can occur:

The child's initial reality is then distorted by their parents' needs and pretenses. Growing up with neurotic caretakers, the child quickly becomes insecure and develops basic anxiety. To deal with this anxiety, the child's imagination creates an idealized self-image:

Once they identify themselves with their idealized image, a number of effects follow. They will make claims on others and on life based on the prestige they feel entitled to because of their idealized self-image. They will impose a rigorous set of standards upon themselves in order to try to measure up to that image. They will cultivate pride, and with that will come the vulnerabilities associated with pride that lacks any foundation. Finally, they will despise themselves for all their limitations. Vicious circles will operate to strengthen all of these effects.

Eventually, as they grow to adulthood, a particular "solution" to all the inner conflicts and vulnerabilities will solidify. They will be either

 expansive, displaying symptoms of narcissism, perfectionism, or vindictiveness
 self-effacing and compulsively compliant, displaying symptoms of neediness or codependence
 resigned, displaying schizoid tendencies

In Horney's view, mild anxiety disorders and full-blown personality disorders all fall under her basic scheme of neurosis as variations in the degree of severity and in the individual dynamics. The opposite of neurosis is a condition Horney calls self-realization, a state of being in which the person responds to the world with the full depth of their spontaneous feelings, rather than with anxiety-driven compulsion. Thus the person grows to actualize their inborn potentialities. Horney compares this process to an acorn that grows and becomes a tree: the acorn has had the potential for a tree inside it all along.

See also
 Engrams (Diagnetics)
 Individuation
 Treatments for PTSD

References

Bibliography
Angyal, Andras. 1965. Neurosis and Treatment: A Holistic Theory, edited by E. Hanfmann and R. M. Jones.
Fenichel, Otto. 1945. The Psychoanalytic Theory of Neurosis. New York: Norton.
Freud, Sigmund. 1953–1974. The Standard Edition of the Complete Psychological Works of Sigmund Freud. (24 vols.), translated by J. Strachey. London: Hogarth.
Horney, Karen. 1937. The Collected Works. (2 vols.). Norton.
 —— 1945. Our Inner Conflicts. Norton.
 1950. Neurosis and Human Growth. Norton.
 Horwitz, A. V. and J. C. Wakefield. 2007. The Loss of Sadness: How Psychiatry Transformed Normal Sorrow into Depressive Disorder. Oxford University Press. .
 Jung, Carl G. [1921] 1971. Psychological Types, (The Collected Works of C. G. Jung 6). Princeton University Press. .
 —— 1966. Two Essays on Analytical Psychology, (The Collected Works of C. G. Jung 7). Princeton University Press. .
 Jung, Carl G., and Aniela Jaffé. [1961] 1989. Memories, Dreams, Reflections. New York: Vantage Books. 
 Jung, Carl G., et al. 1964. Man and His Symbols. New York: Anchor Books / Doubleday. .
Ladell, R. M., and T. H. Hargreaves. 1947. "The Extent of Neurosis." British Medical Journal 2(4526):548–49. . . .
 López-Piñero J.M. (1983) Historical Origins of the Concept of Neurosis (Translated by D. Berrios) Cambridge, Cambridge University Press
 McWilliams, Nancy. 2011. Psychoanalytic Diagnosis: Understanding Personality Structure in the Clinical Process (2nd ed.). Guilford Press. .
Russon, John. 2003. Human Experience: Philosophy, Neurosis, and the Elements of Everyday Life. Albany: State University of New York Press. 
Winokur, Jon. 2005. Encyclopedia Neurotica. .

External links 

 

Psychoanalytic theory
Stress-related disorders
Psychopathological syndromes